March Avery (born October 12, 1932, in New York) is an American painter.

Life 
The daughter of Milton and Sally Avery, March was trained by her father. She grew up around other famous artists such as Mark Rothko, Adolf Gottlieb, Barnett Newman, Byron Browne, and Marsden Hartley. She attended the Little Red School House in New York. She graduated from Barnard College and married Philip Cavanaugh, with whom she has a son named Sean. Her work has been shown at the Brooklyn Museum, Brooklyn, New York; Pennsylvania Academy of the Fine Arts, Philadelphia; New Britain Museum of American Art, Connecticut; and the Chrysler Museum of Art, Norfolk, Virginia.

References

Bibliography 

'Artists' Estates Reputations in Trust'. Ed. by  Magda Salvesen and Diane Cousineau. (New Jersey: Rutgers University Press, 2005), 150–151.

1932 births
Living people
American women painters
Barnard College alumni
20th-century American painters
20th-century American women artists
21st-century American painters
21st-century American women artists